The Natural History Museum is a natural history museum located in Berlin, Germany. It exhibits a vast range of specimens from various segments of natural history and in such domain it is one of three major museums in Germany alongside Naturmuseum Senckenberg in Frankfurt and Museum Koenig in Bonn.

The museum houses more than 30 million zoological, paleontological, and mineralogical specimens, including more than ten thousand type specimens. It is famous for two exhibits: the largest mounted dinosaur in the world (a Giraffatitan skeleton), and a well-preserved specimen of the earliest known bird, Archaeopteryx. The museum's mineral collections date back to the Prussian Academy of Sciences of 1700. Important historic zoological specimens include those recovered by the German deep-sea Valdiva expedition (1898–99), the German Southpolar Expedition (1901–03), and the German Sunda Expedition (1929–31). Expeditions to fossil beds in Tendaguru in former Deutsch Ostafrika (today Tanzania) unearthed rich paleontological treasures. The collections are so extensive that less than 1 in 5000 specimens is exhibited, and they attract researchers from around the world. Additional exhibits include a mineral collection representing 75% of the minerals in the world, a large meteor collection, the largest piece of amber in the world; exhibits of the now-extinct quagga, huia, and tasmanian tiger, and "Bobby" the gorilla, a Berlin Zoo celebrity from the 1920s and 1930s.

In November 2018 the German government and the city of Berlin decided to expand and improve the building for more than €600 million.

Name 
The museum's name has changed several times. German speakers mainly call this museum Museum für Naturkunde since this is the term on the façade. It is also called Naturkundemuseum or even Museum für Naturkunde in Berlin so that it can be distinguished from other museums in Germany also named as Museum für Naturkunde. The museum was founded in 1810 as a part of the Berlin University, which changed its name to Humboldt University of Berlin in 1949. For much of its history, the museum was known as the "Humboldt Museum", but in 2009 it left the university to join the Leibniz Association. The current official name is Museum für Naturkunde – Leibniz-Institut für Evolutions- und Biodiversitätsforschung and the "Humboldt" name is no longer related to this museum. Furthermore: there is another Humboldt-Museum in Berlin in Tegel Palace dealing with brothers Wilhelm and Alexander von Humboldt.

The Berlin U-Bahn station Naturkundemuseum is named after the museum.

Exhibitions 

Since the museum renovation in 2007, a large hall explains biodiversity and the processes of evolution, while several rooms feature regularly changing special exhibitions.

Dinosaur Hall 
The specimen of Giraffatitan brancai in the central exhibit hall is the largest mounted dinosaur skeleton in the world.

It is composed of fossilized bones recovered by the German paleontologist Werner Janensch from the fossil-rich Tendaguru beds of Tanzania between 1909 and 1913. The remains are primarily from one gigantic animal, except for a few tail bones (caudal vertebrae), which belong to another animal of the same size and species.

The historical mount (until about 2005) was 12.72 m (41 ft 5 in) tall, and 22.25 m (73 ft) long. In 2007 it was remounted according to new scientific evidence, reaching a height of 13.27 m. When living, the long-tailed, long-necked herbivore probably weighed 50 t (55 tons). While the Diplodocus carnegiei mounted next to it (a copy of an original from the Carnegie Museum of Natural History in Pittsburgh, United States) actually exceeds it in length (27 m, or 90 ft), the Berlin specimen is taller, and far more massive.

Archaeopteryx 
The "Berlin Specimen" of Archaeopteryx lithographica (HMN 1880), is displayed in the central exhibit hall. The dinosaur-like body with an attached tooth-filled head, wings, claws, long lizard-like tail, and the clear impression of feathers in the surrounding stone is strong evidence of the link between reptiles and birds. The Archaeopteryx is a transitional fossil; and the time of its discovery was apt: coming on the heels of Darwin's 1859 magnum opus, The Origin of Species, made it quite possibly the most famous fossil in the world.

Recovered from the German Solnhofen limestone beds in 1871, it is one of 12 Archaeopteryx to be discovered and the most complete. The first specimen, a single 150-million-year-old feather found in 1860, is also in the possession of the museum.

Minerals Halls 
The MFN's collection comprises roughly 250,000 specimens of minerals, of which roughly 4,500 are on exhibit in the Hall of Minerals.

Evolution in action 
A large hall explains the principles of evolution. It was opened in 2007 after a major renovation of parts of the building.

Tristan – Berlin bares teeth 

The Museum für Naturkunde normally exhibits one of the best-preserved Tyrannosaurus skeletons ("Tristan") worldwide. Of approximately 300 bones, 170 have been preserved, which puts it in the third position among others. 
Tristan is currently at the Natural History Museum of Denmark.

Wet Collection 
The glass-walled Wet Collection Wing with 12.6 km of shelf space displays one million specimens preserved in an ethanol solution and held in 276,000 jars.

History 

Minerals in the museum were originally part of the collection of instructors from the Berlin Mining Academy. The University of Berlin was founded in 1810, and acquired the first of these collections in 1814, under the aegis of the new Museum of Mineralogy. In 1857, the paleontology department was founded, and 1854 a department of petrography and general geology was added.

By 1886 the university was overflowing with collections, so design began on a new building nearby at Invalidenstraße 43, which opened as the Museum für Naturkunde (Natural History Museum) in 1889. The museum was built on the site of a former ironworks and this is reflected in two spectacular cast iron stairwells within the building.

Of particular significance is the contribution of the first director after the move to the new building. In the past the museum simply consisted of the entire collections being open to the public, but Karl Möbius instigated a clear split between a public exhibition space with a few choice specimens, together with explanations of their relevance, and the remainder of the collection held in archives for scientific study.

The collections were damaged by the Allied bombing of Berlin during World War II. The eastern wing was severely damaged, and was rebuilt only in 2011, now housing the alcohol collections (partly publicly accessible).

In 1993, after the shake-up caused by the reunification of Germany, the museum split into the three divisions: The Institutes of Mineralogy, Zoology, and Paleontology. Infighting between the institute directors led to important changes in 2006, which saw the appointment of a director general and the replacement of the former institutes by a division into Collections, Research and Exhibitions. Since 1 January 2009 the museum has officially separated from the Humboldt-University and became part of the Gottfried Wilhelm Leibniz Scientific Community as the Museum für Naturkunde – Leibniz Institute for Evolutionary and Biodiversity Research at the Humboldt University, Berlin. It is legally set up as a foundation.

See also 
List of museums in Germany
List of natural history museums
Biodiversity Heritage Library for Europe (Museum für Naturkunde is a lead institution)
Zoosystematics and Evolution and Deutsche Entomologische Zeitschrift (scholarly journals associated with the museum)

References

Further reading 
 
 

 Maier, Gerhard. African dinosaurs unearthed: the Tendaguru expeditions. Bloomington, Indiana: Indiana University Press, 2003. (Life of the Past Series).
Damaschun, F., Böhme, G. & H. Landsberg, 2000. Naturkundliche Museen der Berliner Universität – Museum für Naturkunde: 190 Jahre Sammeln und Forschen. 86–106.— In: H. Bredekamp, J. Brüning & C. Weber (eds.). Theater der Natur und Kunst  Theatrum Naturae et Artis. Essays Wunderkammern des Wissens, Humboldt-Universität zu Berlin & Henschel Verlag. 1–280. Berlin.

External links 

  
 History of Humboldt-Universität zu Berlin
 History of the mineralogical collections at the Natural History Museum in Berlin
 History of the mineral collection

Museums in Berlin
Berlin
Mineralogy museums
Shell museums
Geology museums in Germany
Museums established in 1810
Humboldt University of Berlin
University museums in Germany
 Scientist
1810 establishments in Prussia
Buildings and structures in Mitte
Dinosaur museums